Zohar Fresco  (born 1969) is an Israeli percussionist and composer, specializing on the frame drum. He is known to have created his personal musical technique that combines various styles of playing the frame drum. He is a member of the jazz trio MOŻDŻER DANIELSSON FRESCO, together with Polish pianist Leszek Możdżer and Swedish double bass player Lars Danielsson. Previously, he was a member of the Israeli world music band Bustan Abraham, which existed between 1991 and 2003.

During his career, he has played with musicians such as the jazz drummer Hamid Drake, violin player Taiseer Elias, saxophonist Daniel Zamir and oud player Ara Dinkjian. He has also toured with American composer Philip Glass and others.

Selected discography 

 Bustan Abraham with Bustan Abraham (1992)
 Pictures Through The Painted Window with Bustan Abraham (1994)
 Abadai with Bustan Abraham feat. Ross Daly (1996)
 Fanar with Bustan Abraham feat. Zakir Hussain and Hariprasad Chaurasia (1997)
 Mashreq Classics with Ziryab Trio (1997)
 Hamsa with Bustan Abraham (2000)
 Ashra with Bustan Abraham (2000)
 Live Concerts with Bustan Abraham (2004)
 The Time, with Leszek Możdżer and Lars Danielsson (2005)
 Between Us and the Light with Leszek Możdżer and Lars Danielsson (2006)
 An Armenian in America with Ara Dinkjian (2006)
 Napoli-Tel Aviv with Achinoam Nini and Gil Dor (2007)
 Live with Leszek Możdżer and Lars Danielsson (2007)
 Polska with Leszek Możdżer and Lars Danielsson (2013)

References

External links 
 

Israeli percussionists
1969 births
Living people
Jazz percussionists